Ali Boumnijel (born 13 April 1966) is a Tunisian former professional footballer who played as a goalkeeper. He works for Sochaux as assistant coach. At international level, he represented the Tunisian national team.

Born in Menzel Jemil, Boumnijel began his career in FC Gueugnon in France, however without playing any games. His first game as a professional footballer came on 20 October 1991 for AS Nancy in a 1–3 loss to AJ Auxerre. Afterwards he returned to his previous team, where he played five seasons, until changing to SC Bastia. He played for Bastia for six years, and then one season at FC Rouen. In 2004, he moved back to Tunisia to play for Club Africain.

In the national team he debuted on 27 November 1991 against Côte d'Ivoire. Having established himself as a competitive goalkeeper he went on to play for Tunisia in the 1998 FIFA World Cup, 2002 FIFA World Cup and 2006 FIFA World Cup . Boumnijel was Tunisia's first choice goalkeeper, and played at the 2004 African Nations Cup where the Tunisia team won. In the semifinals he saved a crucial penalty from Peter Odemwingie to help Tunisia beat Nigeria in a penalty shootout.

Aged 40, he was the oldest player at the 2006 FIFA World Cup, Boumnijel has been praised for his great leadership and goalkeeping skills during the World Cup.

Honours
Tunisia
 Africa Cup of Nations: 2004

He concede a goal from Kamel ZAIM in the final of the cup w howa yetfarej.

References

External links

1966 births
Living people
People from Bizerte Governorate
Association football goalkeepers
Tunisian footballers
Tunisian expatriate footballers
Expatriate footballers in France
Tunisian expatriate sportspeople in France
Tunisia international footballers
Ligue 1 players
Ligue 2 players
Tunisian Ligue Professionnelle 1 players
AS Nancy Lorraine players
FC Gueugnon players
SC Bastia players
FC Rouen players
Club Africain players
1998 FIFA World Cup players
2002 FIFA World Cup players
2005 FIFA Confederations Cup players
2006 FIFA World Cup players
1994 African Cup of Nations players
1998 African Cup of Nations players
2004 African Cup of Nations players
2006 Africa Cup of Nations players
Tunisian football managers
Étoile Sportive du Sahel managers
Tunisian expatriate football managers
Tunisian expatriate sportspeople in China
Tunisian expatriate sportspeople in Qatar